Arthur Sowden (6 April 1878 – 24 December 1954) was an Australian rules footballer who played with Melbourne in the Victorian Football League (VFL).

Sowden played as a wingman and represented the VFL in an interstate fixture against South Australia in 1902. He was captain of Melbourne in the 1906 VFL season, his last.

References

External links

 
 

1878 births
VFL/AFL players born in England
Australian rules footballers from Victoria (Australia)
Melbourne Football Club players
1954 deaths
English emigrants to colonial Australia
People educated at Scotch College, Melbourne
People from Chelsea, London
Sportspeople from London